This is a list of current and former Roman Catholic churches in the Roman Catholic Archdiocese of Philadelphia. The cathedral church of the diocese is the Cathedral-Basilica of Ss. Peter & Paul. There are more than 200 churches in the archdiocese, divided for administrative purposes into four episcopal regions, each headed by an auxiliary bishop, and 12 deaneries. The Archbishop of Philadelphia has general oversight of the whole archdiocese.

Episcopal Region 1: Delaware and Chester Counties

Deanery 1: Eastern Delaware County

Deanery 2: Western Delaware County

Deanery 3: Western Chester County and Oxford Region

Deanery 4: Northern Chester County

Episcopal Region 2: Montgomery County

Deanery 5: Western Montgomery County

Deanery 6: Main Line, Bridgeport and Roxborough

Deanery 7: Eastern Montgomery County and North West Philadelphia

Episcopal Region III: Philadelphia

Deanery 8: South Philadelphia and Northern Liberties

Deanery 9: West Philadelphia and Center City

Episcopal Region IV: Bucks County and Philadelphia

Deanery 10: Central and Upper Bucks County

Deanery 11: Upper North East Philadelphia and Lower Bucks County

Deanery 12: Lower North East Philadelphia

Other

References

 
Philadelphia